Cosmelli may refer to
Massimo Cosmelli (born 1943), Italian basketball player
Meseta Cosmelli Airport in Chile